Yusuf Ma Dexin (also Ma Tesing; 1794–1874) was a Hui Chinese Hanafi-Maturidi scholar from Yunnan, known for his fluency and proficiency in both Arabic and Persian, and for his knowledge of Islam. He also went by the Chinese name Ma Fuchu. He used the Arabic name Abd al-Qayyum Ruh al-Din Yusuf (عبد القيوم روح الدين يوسف). He was also styled as "Mawlana al-Hajj Yusuf Ruh al-Din Ma Fujuh" (مولانا الحاج  يوسف روح الدين  ما  فو جوه).

Biography 
Sayyid Ajjal Shams al-Din Omar was an ancestor in the 25th generation of Ma Dexin.

Hajj 
Ma performed the Hajj in 1841, leaving China by a circuitous route; as ocean travel out of China had been disrupted by the Opium War, he chose instead to leave with a group of Muslim merchants travelling overland. After passing through Xishuangbanna, they went south to Burma, then took a riverboat along the Irrawaddy River from Mandalay to Rangoon. From Rangoon, they were able to board a steamship which took them all the way to the Arabian Peninsula. After his time in Mecca, he stayed in the Middle East for another eight years; he first went to Cairo, where he studied at Al-Azhar University, then travelled throughout the Ottoman Empire, going to Suez, Alexandria, Jerusalem, Istanbul, Cyprus, and Rhodes.

Return to China 
As a prominent Muslim in Yunnan, Ma became involved in the Panthay Rebellion in Yunnan shortly after he returned from the Hajj. The Panthay Rebellion, which flared up in 1856 as part of a wider series of uprisings by Muslims and other minorities, was led mainly by Du Wenxiu; though Ma disagreed with Du Wenxiu's revolutionary methods, he also encouraged his followers to aid in the uprising; later, he would try to act as a peacemaker between the central government forces and the rebels. Ma Dexin said that Neo-Confucianism was reconcilable with Islam, approved of Ma Rulong defecting to the Qing and he also assisted other Muslims in defecting. However, despite his efforts to bring about peace, the Qing government still regarded him as a rebel and a traitor; he was executed two years after the suppression of the rebellion. Europeans reported that he was either poisoned or executed.

Role in the Panthay Rebellion 
Ma Dexin was the most prominent Hui scholar in Yunnan. He used his prestige to act as a mediator between the different Hui factions & "helped orient and validate" the rebellion throughout the province. He was respected by both Du Wenxiu & Ma Rulong as a spiritual leader. In 1860; Ma Dexin sent forces to help Du Wenxiu fight the Qing; assuring him that:"I have already secretly ordered my disciples [mensheng] Ma [Rulong] as the Grand Commander of Three Directions, with Ma Rong as second in command . . . to launch a rearguard attack from their base in Yimen."Ma Dexin possessed a telescope that he had purchased while in Singapore, yet was unable to use it. In late 1867, M. Garnier a member of a French expedition met Ma in Kunming and adjusted the lenses for him. A grateful Ma then agreed to write for them a letter of recommendation to Du Wenxiu. Ma also asked officials along the route to Dali to provide the best service to the French Explorers. Muslim soldiers let the explorers pass due to Ma's letter.

Surrender to the Qing 
There is evidence that Ma Dexin, Ma Rulong & the Hui forces with them only pretended to surrender (in 1862) in order to gain access to the city of Kunming. Even after their supposed capitulation to the Qing; Ma Rulong continued to issue proclamations using his seal "Generalissimo of the Three Directions" while Ma Dexin refused to accept the Civil title granted to him; not wanting to be associated with the Qing regime. The Hui rebels taunted the Hui who hadn't joined the rebellion as being fake Hui (jia Huizi). Taiwanese researcher Li Shoukong asserts that many Hui rebels had employed a similar tactic of pretending to surrender in the early years of the rebellion.

To test his loyalty Ma Rulong was sent to pacify the disgruntled magistrate of Lin'an (in Southern Yunnan). A few weeks after Ma Rulong left the city; rebel forces led by Ma Rong and Ma Liansheng stormed Kunming & captured it. Ma Rulong's forces had come to believe that he could no longer be trusted to achieve their goal of uniting under a single rebel government. In 1863 Ma Dexin declared himself "King-Who-Pacifies-the-South (Pingnan Wang)", seized the official seals & stopped using the Qing reign year when dating documents. Ma Dexin hoped to keep the rebel forces united under him until he could hand over control to Du Wenxiu.

Ma Rulong immediately rushed back to Kunming, and attacked the city along with Qing forces;. He ordered Ma Dexin to give up his seals of office & placed him under house arrest.  According to a French missionary, Ma Rulong "arrested Lao Baba [Ma Dexin] whose conduct, as you know, has always been very ambiguous, but not any more. This old fox was consigned to the palace in which Ma [Rulong's] family lives."

Ma Dexin opposed Ma Rulong's acceptance of the Qing policy of "using Hui to fight other Hui". When he travelled to Dali to meet Du Wenxiu for their only and final meeting, he told him that:"The provincial government has given Eastern Hui leaders' official positions so that the Hui will fight each other. This is the cruelest of [the Qing's] furtive plots. So we must turn it around [and use it] against them . . . why should we fall into their trap?"He also warned Du that:"We should, have the [Qing] government fall into a Hui plan, not let the Hui fall into the government's [plan]."

Execution 
The Qing official Cen Yuying disliked Ma Dexin and the Hui. In April 1874 he ordered an investigation into Ma Dexin's activities and charged him along with three others of formenting unrest. Cen claimed that when Ma Dexin was found he was on a hunger strike & on the brink of death, hence he ordered that Ma be "summarily executed". Though few Hui were convinced by Cen's words and knew that Ma had been assassinated.

Works
Sources say that Ma produced the first Chinese translation of the Qur'an, as well as writing numerous books in Arabic and Persian about Islam. His most famous writings compared Islamic culture and the Confucian philosophy in an effort to find a theoretical and theological basis for their coexistence. At the same time, he harshly criticised the absorption of Buddhist and Taoist elements into the practise of Islam in China. As he is generally regarded as an orthodox Islamic thinker, his writings also demonstrated a positive attitude towards Tasawwuf, or Sufi mysticism. In total, he published over 30 books, most of which fall into five categories.
 Islamic jurisprudence and philosophy: 四典要会, 大化总归, 道行究竟, 理学折衷, 性命宗旨, 礼法启爱 据理质证, 
 Islamic calendar and history: 寰宇述要 (Description of the World), 天方历源 (History of Arabia)
 Introduction and analysis of works of other Muslim authors in China, such as Ma Zhu and Liu Zhu: 真诠要录, 指南要言, 天方性理注释
 Qur'an: the first five volumes of 宝命真经直解 (True Revealed Scripture), the earliest translation of the meanings of the Qur'an into Chinese
 Arabic grammar: 纳哈五 (Nahawu), 赛尔夫 (Saierfu), 阿瓦米勒 (Awamile)
 Other: 朝觐途记 (Diary of a pilgrimage), a description of his time in Mecca; originally in Arabic, translated to Chinese by Ma's disciple Ma Anli

Ma Dexin appears to have picked up anti-Shia views from his time in the Ottoman lands and referred to them by the derogatory name Rafida 若废子 in his works which attacked and criticized Shias and some Sufis. Ma, like other most other Hui in China, belonged to the Hanafi Madhhab of Sunni Islam.

The Chinese Muslim Arabic writing scholars Ma Lianyuan 馬聯元 1841-1903 was trained by Ma Fuchu 馬复初 1794-1874 in Yunnan with Ma Lianyuan writing books on law 'Umdat al-'Islām (عمدة الإسلام) a grammar book on ṣarf (صرف) called Hawā and Ma Fuchu writing a grammar book on naḥw (نحو) called Muttasiq (متسق) and Kāfiya (كافية). Šarḥ al-laṭā'if (شرح اللطائف) Liu Zhi's The Philosophy of Arabia 天方性理 (Tianfang Xingli) Arabic translation by (Muḥammad Nūr al-Ḥaqq ibn Luqmān as-Ṣīnī) (محمد نور الحق ابن لقمان الصيني), the Arabic name of Ma Lianyuan. Islamic names, du'ā' (دُعَاء), ġusl (غسل), prayers, and other ceremonies were taught in the Miscellaneous studies (Zaxue) 雜學 while 'āyāt (آيات) from the Qur'an were taught in the Xatm al-Qur'an (ختم القرآن) (Haiting). Ma Fuchu brought an Arabic Qasidat (Gesuide jizhu 格随德集注) poem to China. It was al-Būṣīrī's Qaṣīdat al-Burda.

See also 
 Islam in China
 Wang Daiyu
 Ma Zhu
 Liu Zhi (scholar), an earlier Muslim scholar who also attempted to reconcile Islam and Confucian philosophy
 Muhammad Ma Jian, a later Chinese translator of the Qur'an who also studied at Al-Azhar
 List of Hanafis
 List of Ash'aris and Maturidis
 List of Muslim theologians

Sources

Notes

Further reading

External links
 English translation and commentary of his 续天方三字经 “Three-Character Classic on the Kaaba”
 试论马德新著作中的"天"及伊斯兰教和儒教关系
 试论马德新著作中的“天”及伊斯兰教和儒教关系
 王建平：试论马德新著作中的“天”及伊斯兰教和儒教关系
 马德新的大化思想
 马德新的大化思想 
 《古蘭經》在中國

Hanafis
Maturidis
19th-century Muslim theologians
Muslim reformers
Shaykh al-Islāms
Sunni Sufis
Sunni imams
Sunni Muslim scholars of Islam
Chinese scholars
Chinese Sunni Muslims
Critics of Shia Islam
Hui people
Qing dynasty translators
People from Dali
Al-Azhar University alumni
Translators of the Quran into Chinese
Chinese spiritual writers
Writers from Yunnan
19th-century Chinese writers
1794 births
1874 deaths
19th-century Chinese translators